Come Home with Me is the third studio album by Harlem rapper Cam'ron and it is also his debut under Roc-A-Fella Records. The album was released on May 14, 2002, by Roc-A-Fella Records, Diplomat Records and Def Jam Recordings. It served as an introduction of the Cam'ron-fronted rap collective, the Diplomats, to the general public. There are featured guest appearances from the Diplomats, DJ Kay Slay, Daz Dillinger, Tiffany, Jay-Z, McGruff, Memphis Bleek, and Beanie Sigel. To date, it is his most commercially successful album; it peaked at #2 on the Billboard 200 with first-week sales of 226,000 copies, and eventually sold one million copies in the United States, being certified Platinum by the RIAA.

Its two singles were "Oh Boy" (featuring Juelz Santana) and "Hey Ma" (featuring Juelz Santana, Freekey Zekey, and Toya). "Oh Boy" held the number one spot on the Hot R&B/Hip-Hop Singles for five straight weeks, the number one spot on the Hot Rap Tracks and peaked at number four on the Billboard Hot 100. The second hit was "Hey Ma", which reached number three on the Hot 100 and number eight on the UK Singles Chart, becoming his biggest hit. "Daydreaming" was a later single released in 2003 but failed to duplicate the success from his earlier singles.

Critical reception

AllMusic's Jason Birchmeier praised Cam's presence throughout the record and Just Blaze supplying him with beats that strengthen him on "Oh Boy" and "The Roc (Just Fire)", concluding that "Overall, Cam'ron couldn't return with a stronger comeback album than this: he's affiliated with one of the industry's most successful labels, graced with a hot producer, and armed with a dynamite single." Steve 'Flash' Juon of RapReviews felt the pairing of Cam with Roc-A-Fella's team of featured artists and producers helped utilize his rap flow to its potential by crafting quality tracks with a "slamming assembly of b-boy beats" despite a few duds in "Live My Life" and the title track, concluding that "For the beats though, and for some of Cam'Ron's best rhymes to date, Come Home With Me will be a summer anthem album for Harlemites and Roc-A-Fella Records ryders alike." Jon Caramanica, writing for Rolling Stone, commended Cam's unique lyrical abilities but felt the stories he delivered about drugs and women were half-hearted and lacked charisma, and only partially worked when the production gave them "the substance and emotional center they otherwise lack."

Track listing

Sample credits
 "Intro" contains excerpts from "Oscar" (aka "You Should Get an Oscar"), written by Norman Harris and Ron Tyson, and performed by Blue Magic.
 "Oh Boy" contains excerpts from "I'm Going Down, written by Norman Whitfield, and performed by Rose Royce.
 "Live My Life (Leave Me Alone)" embodies portions of
"Ambitionz az a Ridah", written by Delmar Arnaud and Tupac Shakur.
Sound of da Police, written by Lawrence Parker, Bryan Chandler, Alan Lomax, Eric Burdon, and Rodney Lemay.
 "Daydreaming" contains interpolations from the composition "Day Dreaming" written by Aretha Franklin.
 "Come Home with Me" contains excerpts from the composition "She Is My Lady", written by George Stanley Clinton.
 "Hey Ma" contains excerpts from "Easy Like Sunday Morning", written by Lionel Richie, and performed by Commodores.
 "On Fire Tonight"
 Contains interpolations of "Have You Seen Her", written by Barbara Acklin and Eugene Record.
 Contains samples from "You, Me and He", written by James Mtume, and performed by Mtume.
 "I Just Wanna" contains excerpts from "Untitled (How Does It Feel)", written by D'Angelo and Raphael Saadiq, and performed by D'Angelo.
 "Dead or Alive" contains excerpts from "Lazarus", written and performed by Buffy Saint-Marie.
 "The ROC (Just Fire)" contains excerpts from the composition and sound recording "Warlock" by Tilsley Orchestral.
 "Tomorrow" contains interpolations from "Love Me in a Special Way", written by El DeBarge.

Charts and certifications

Weekly charts

Year-end charts

Certifications

References

2002 albums
Cam'ron albums
Def Jam Recordings albums
Albums produced by Just Blaze
Albums produced by Kanye West
Albums produced by Ty Fyffe
Albums produced by the Heatmakerz
Roc-A-Fella Records albums
Diplomat Records albums
Albums produced by Jay-Z